United States Army General Harry Reuben Anderson (January 20, 1844 - November 22, 1918).

Biography
He was born on January 20, 1844, in Chillicothe, Ohio as Henry Reuben Anderson to Eliza Ann and William Marshall Anderson. He attended St. Joseph's College (Perry County, Ohio) in Perry County, Ohio. He was appointed to the United States Military Academy.

He died on November 22, 1918, in Circleville, Ohio.  He was buried at Arlington National Cemetery.

External links

References

United States Military Academy alumni
Burials at Arlington National Cemetery
1844 births
1918 deaths